Pelargonium flower break virus (PFBV) is a plant pathogenic virus of the family Tombusviridae.

External links
 Family Groups - The Baltimore Method

Viral plant pathogens and diseases
Tombusviridae